Storyville is a documentary strand presented by the BBC featuring international documentaries. It first aired on 15 November 1997. It has been part of BBC Film since 2020.

List of documentaries

2018 Series

2016–2017 Series 

7. Forever Pure – Football and Racism in Jerusalem
6. The Cult that Stole Children – Inside The Family
5. Brides for Sale – Sonita
4. Jim: The James Foley Story
3. Weiner – Sexts, Scandals and Politics
2. Chasing Asylum – Inside Australia's Detention Camps
1. Silk Road: Drugs, Death and the Dark Web – Season 2017 – Episode 21 – 21 August 2017

2015–2016 Series 
Episodes from the 2015–2016 series

2014–2015 Series
Episodes from the 2014–2015 series:

2013–2014 series 

24. Shooting Bigfoot: America's Monster Hunters
8. Smash & Grab – The Story of the Pink Panthers
7. Pussy Riot – A Punk Prayer

2012–2013 Series 

18. The Pirate Bay
14. Queen of Versailles
The Road: A Story of Life & Death by Marc Isaacs

Other series
Episodes from previous series:

References

External links

1997 British television series debuts
1990s British documentary television series
2000s British documentary television series
2010s British documentary television series
2020s British documentary television series
BBC television documentaries
English-language television shows